Gowd-e Howz (also Romanized as Gowd-e Ḩowẕ and Gowd Ḩowz; also known as Gowd Hofz) is a village in Dehsard Rural District, in the Central District of Arzuiyeh County, Kerman Province, Iran. At the 2006 census, its population was 120, in 29 families.

References 

Populated places in Arzuiyeh County